Cimbex quadrimaculatus is a species of sawflies in the family Cimbicidae.

Taxonomy
Cimbex quadrimaculatus was formerly classified in the genus Palaeocimbex along with four other species and was the type species of the subgenus Deuterocimbex. Both taxa have since been synonymized under the genus Cimbex.

Description
The body is dark brown to black with extensive yellow markings on the pronotum and abdomen. The wings are lightly infuscate, while the antennae are predominantly orange with darker scapes.

Their larvae are whitish with yellow and black markings.

Biology
Cimbex quadrimaculatus is considered one of the serious pests of almonds. Other notable host plants include Crataegus monogyna, Prunus cerasus, and Prunus domestica.

A single generation is produced each year. Eggs are laid in the early summer. After hatching, the larvae eat from the edges of their host plants until spinning a cocoon. They then enter diapause over the winter as a pre-pupa. They pupate the following spring.

Larvae and pupae of Cimbex quadrimaculatus are parasitized by three species of ichneumonid wasp: Listrognathus mactator, Opheltes glaucopterus, and ''Phobetes nigriceps.

Distribution
This species is present in Europe and in the Near East.

References

External links
 Fauna europaea

Insects described in 1766
Cimbicidae
Hymenoptera of Europe